Bilderberg conferences are an annual private gathering of 120 to 150 people of the European and North American political elite, experts from industry, finance, academia, and the media, established in 1954 by Prince Bernhard.

The 2019 Bilderberg Conference took place between 30 May - 2 June 2019 at the Fairmont Le Montreux Palace in Montreux, Switzerland.

Agenda
A list of key topics for discussion at the 2019 Bilderberg conference was published on the Bilderberg website shortly before the meeting. Topics for discussion included:

A Stable Strategic Order
What Next for Europe?
Climate Change and Sustainability
China
Russia
The Future of Capitalism
Brexit
The Ethics of Artificial Intelligence
The Weaponisation of Social Media
The Importance of Space
Cyber Threats

Delegates (alphabetical)
A list of expected delegates was published by the Bilderberg Group.

Chairman: Henri de Castries

Stacey Abrams
Andrew Adonis
Roger Altman
Louise Arbour
Inés Arrimadas
Audrey Azoulay
James H. Baker (DOD)
Patricia Barbizet
José Manuel Barroso
Dominic Barton
Nick Bostrom
Ana Botín
Svein Richard Brandtzæg
Børge Brende
Thomas Buberl
Kathalijne Buitenweg
Mark Carney
Pablo Casado
Jared Cohen
Matthew Daniels
Paschal Donohoe
Mathias Döpfner
James O. Ellis
Niall Ferguson
Jeremy Fleming
Timothy Garton Ash
Richard Gnodde
François Godement
Adam Grant
Lilli Gruber
Edeltraud Hanappi-Egger
Connie Hedegaard
Mary Kay Henry
Mellody Hobson
Reid Hoffman
Vernon Jordan
Sigrid Kaag
Alex Karp
Henry Kissinger
Ömer Koç
Stephen Kotkin
Ivan Krastev
Henry Kravis
Ulf Kristersson
André Kudelski
Jared Kushner
Bruno Le Maire
Ursula von der Leyen
Thomas Leysen
Erkki Liikanen
Helge Lund
Ueli Maurer
Sara Mazur
Megan McArdle
Claire McCaskill
Fernando Medina
John Micklethwait
Zanny Minton Beddoes
Craig Mundie
Satya Nadella
Willem-Alexander of the Netherlands
Michael O'Leary
David Petraeus
Matthew Pottinger
Patrick Pouyanné
Jüri Ratas
Matteo Renzi
Johan Rockström
Robert Rubin
Mark Rutte
Michael Sabia
John Sawers
Nadia Schadlow
Eric Schmidt
Nemat Shafik
Radosław Sikorski
P. W. Singer
Metin Sitti
Timothy D. Snyder
Bård Vegar Solhjell
Jens Stoltenberg
Mustafa Suleyman
Linda Teuteberg
Tidjane Thiam
Peter Thiel
Rafał Trzaskowski
Mark Tucker
Tom Tugendhat
Jessica Uhl
Darren Walker
Marcus Wallenberg
Martin Wolf
Gerhard Zeiler
Dieter Zetsche

See also
List of Bilderberg meetings

References

2019 conferences
2019 in international relations
2019 in Switzerland
2019
International conferences in Switzerland
May 2019 events in Switzerland
June 2019 events in Switzerland